Preston by-election may refer to one of several by-election held for the British House of Commons constituency of Preston, in Lancashire:

1903 Preston by-election
1915 Preston by-election
1929 Preston by-election
1940 Preston by-election
1946 Preston by-election
2000 Preston by-election